Jesse Bernard "Cab" Renick (September 29, 1917 – November 25, 1999) was an American basketball player who competed in the 1948 Summer Olympics.  Renick was A 6'2" Guard for Marietta High School in Marietta, Oklahoma.  He went on to star at Oklahoma A&M University (now Oklahoma State).  He was All-Missouri Valley Conference in 1939 and 1940 as well as an All-American in 1939 and 1940.

OSU's first two-time All-American selection, he played on the United States Gold Metal Olympic Team alongside fellow Oklahoma A&M great Bob Kurland. He led the Cowboys to 45-11 record in his two seasons.

Renick was also the second Native American, after Jim Thorpe, to win an Olympic Gold Medal.

References

External links
profile

1917 births
1999 deaths
All-American college men's basketball players
American men's basketball players
Basketball players at the 1948 Summer Olympics
Basketball players from Oklahoma
Junior college men's basketball players in the United States
Medalists at the 1948 Summer Olympics
Native American basketball players
Oklahoma State Cowboys basketball players
Olympic gold medalists for the United States in basketball
People from Marietta, Oklahoma
People from Murray County, Oklahoma
Phillips 66ers players
United States men's national basketball team players
Guards (basketball)